Octopus Energy Group is a British renewable energy group specialising in sustainable energy. It was founded in 2015 with the backing of British fund management company Octopus Group, a British asset management company. Headquartered in London, the company has operations in the UK, France, Germany, Italy, Spain, Australia, Japan, New Zealand and the United States. As of September 2021 the company has over three million domestic and business customers, making it the fourth largest energy supplier in the UK.

Octopus Energy Group operates a wide range of business divisions, including Octopus Energy Retail, Octopus Energy for Business, Octopus Energy Services, Octopus Electric Vehicles, Octopus Energy Generation, Octopus Hydrogen, Kraken, Kraken Flex and the not-for-profit Centre for Net Zero. The company also supplies software services to other energy suppliers.

History 
 
Octopus Energy was established in August 2015 as a subsidiary of Octopus Capital Limited. Trading began in December 2015. Greg Jackson is the founder of the company and holds the position of chief executive.

By April 2018, the company had 198,000 customers and had made an energy procurement deal with Shell. Later in 2018, Octopus gained the 100,000 customers of Iresa Limited, under Ofgem's "supplier of last resort" process, after Iresa ceased trading. The same year, Octopus replaced SSE as the energy supplier for M&S Energy, a brand of Marks & Spencer, and bought Affect Energy, which had 22,000 customers.

In 2018 Hanwha Energy Retail Australia (Nectr) chose the Kraken platform, developed by Octopus to provide billing, CRM and other technology services to support its launch into the Australian retail energy market.

In August 2019, an agreement with Midcounties Co-operative saw Octopus gain more than 300,000 customers, taking its total beyond 1 million. Three Co-op brands were affected: Octopus acquired the customers of the GB Energy and Flow Energy brands, and began to operate the accounts of Co-op Energy customers on a white label basis, while Midcounties retained responsibility for acquiring new Co-op Energy customers.

In both 2018 and 2019, Octopus was the only energy supplier to earn "Recommended Provider" status from the Which? consumer organisation. In January 2020, Octopus was ranked first in a Which? survey and was one of three recommended providers. In January 2021, Octopus was ranked second and was one of two recommended providers, becoming the only energy provider in the UK to have been named as a recommended provider four years running.

In January 2020, ENGIE UK announced that it was selling its residential energy supply business (comprising around 70,000 UK residential customers) to Octopus. The same month saw the launch of London Power, a partnership with the Mayor of London.

In 2020 Octopus completed two funding rounds totalling $577m, making the company the highest funded UK tech start-up that year.

In November 2020 Octopus acquired Manchester-based smart grid energy software company Upside Energy, which in June 2021 rebranded as KrakenFlex.

The same month saw Octopus launch the not-for-profit Octopus Centre for Net Zero (OCNZ), a research organisation tasked with creating models and policy recommendations for potential paths to a green energy future.
 
In February 2021, CEO Greg Jackson said on a BBC News interview that Octopus does not operate a human resources department.

In March 2021 the Financial Times listed Octopus at number 23 on their list of the fastest growing companies in Europe.

In July 2021 Octopus rose 12 places on the UK Customer Service Index to 17th, making it the only energy company in the Top 50.

In 2021, Octopus built the UK's first R&D and training centre for the decarbonisation of heat. Located in Slough, the centre will train 1000 heat pump engineers per year and develop new heating systems. 

In September 2021, Octopus was appointed as the Supplier of Last Resort (SOLR) for Avro Energy, acquiring Avro Energy's domestic customers and increasing their customer base to 3.1m customers.

In November 2021, Octopus announced in Manchester that it had signed a deal with the city region as part of a bid to become carbon neutral by 2038.

In October 2022, Octopus reached an agreement to acquire Bulb Energy's 1.5 million customers.

In February 2023, Marks & Spencer announced it was pulling out of the energy supply business and ending its five-year partnership with Octopus; the 60,000 M&S Energy customers would transfer to Octopus Energy in April.

Investments 
 
In September 2019 Octopus acquired German start-up 4hundred for £15m; the acquisition of 4hundred, which had 11,000 customers, was Octopus' first overseas expansion.

In May 2020, Australian electricity and gas supplier Origin Energy paid 507 million for a 20% stake in Octopus. This meant Octopus gained "unicorn" status, as a startup company with a value in excess of £1 billion. In September of that year, Octopus acquired Evolve Energy, a US Silicon Valley-based start-up, in a $5m deal. The acquisition was the first step in Octopus' $100m US expansion; at the time of the acquisition, Octopus announced it was aiming to acquire 25 million US customers, and 100 million global customers in total, by 2027.

In December 2020, Tokyo Gas paid about 20 billion yen ($193 million) for a 9.7% stake in Octopus, valuing the company at $2.1bn. Octopus and Tokyo Gas agreed to launch the Octopus brand in Japan via a 30:70 joint venture to provide electricity from renewable sources, amongst other services. Origin invested a further $50m at the same time, to maintain its 20% stake.

In August 2021, Octopus entered the Spanish market with the acquisition of green energy start-up Umeme. Upon the acquisition, Octopus announced it was targeting a million Spanish energy accounts under its brand by 2027. In November 2021, Octopus acquired Italian energy retailer SATO Luce e Gas, rebranding the business as Octopus Energy Italy, investing an initial £51m and targeting 5% of the Italian market by 2025. As a result of these acquisitions, Octopus now has retail, generation or technology licences in 13 countries across four continents.

In September 2021, Generation Investment Management, co-founded and chaired by Al Gore, purchased a 13% stake in Octopus Energy Group in a deal worth $600m. The investment increased the company's valuation to $4.6bn, with the cash injection to be used by Octopus to increase its investment in new technologies for cheaper and faster decarbonisation.

In December 2021, Octopus Energy announced a long-term partnership with Canada Pension Plan Investment Board, raising US$300m and taking the valuation of Octopus Energy Group to approximately $5bn.

In January 2022 Octopus Energy entered the French market with the acquisition of Plüm énergie, a French energy start-up with 100,000 retail and corporate accounts. Plüm was subsequently rebranded as Octopus Energy France.

Operations

Gas and electricity supply 
As of August 2021, the company has over 2.4 million domestic and business customers.

Besides industry-standard fixed and variable tariffs, the company is known for innovative tariffs which are made possible by the national rollout of smart meters. These include:

 Octopus Tracker – gas and electricity prices change every day, and are based on wholesale prices for that day, with disclosure of overheads and the company's profit margin.
 Octopus Agile – electricity prices change every half hour, according to a schedule published the previous day, determined from wholesale prices. The price occasionally goes negative (i.e. customers are paid to use electricity) at times of high generation and low demand.
 Octopus Go – a tariff with a reduced rate for an overnight period, intended for owners of electric vehicles.

In March 2019, Octopus announced it had partnered with Amazon's Alexa virtual assistant, to optimise home energy use through the Agile Octopus time-of-use tariff.

As part of their partnership agreed in August 2019, Midcounties Co-operative and Octopus established a joint venture to develop the UK's community energy market and encourage small-scale electricity generation.

Brands 
Besides the Octopus Energy brand,  customers are supplied under the Ebico Energy, Affect Energy, Co-op Energy, M&S Energy and London Power brands.

Electricity generation 
In its early years the company did not generate gas or electricity, instead making purchases on the wholesale markets. In 2019, Octopus stated that all its electricity came from renewable sources, and began to offer a "green" gas tariff with carbon offsetting. In July 2021, Octopus acquired sister company Octopus Renewables which claims to be the UK's largest investor in solar farms, and also invests in wind power and anaerobic digesters. At the time of the acquisition, the generation assets were reported to be worth over £3.4billion.

In October 2020, Octopus partnered with Tesla Energy to power the Tesla Energy Plan, which is designed to power a home with 100% clean energy either from solar panels or Octopus. The plan allows households to become part of the UK Tesla Virtual Power Plant, which connects a network homes that generate, store and return electricity to grid at peak times.

In January 2021, Octopus acquired two 73 metre (240') wind turbines to power their 'Fan Club' tariff, which offers households living near its turbines cheaper electricity prices when the wind is blowing strongly. Customers on the tariff get a 20% discount on the unit price when the turbines are spinning, and a 50% discount when the wind is above 8m/s (20 mph). In November 2021, Octopus Energy announced plans to raise £4 billion to fund the global expansion of its Fan Club model, which would be expanded to include solar farms. By 2030, Octopus aims to supply around 2.5 million households with green electricity through Fan Club schemes.

Also in November 2021, Octopus Energy Group signed a deal with Elia Group at COP26 to build a "smart" green grid across Belgium and Germany. The company’s flexibility platform KrakenFlex will be used together with Elia Group’s energy data affiliate, re.alto, to enable electric vehicles, heat pumps and other green technologies to be used for grid balancing.

In January 2022, it was announced that Octopus Renewables had bought the Broons/Biterne-Sud wind farm in Cotes d’Armor, northeast Brittany, France from Energiequelle for an undisclosed price. In June of that year, the group's fund management team bought the rights to develop the 35MW Gaishecke wind farm near Frankfurt, Germany.

Investment trust 
Octopus Renewables is contracted as the investment manager for Octopus Renewables Infrastructure Trust, an investment trust established in 2019 which owns wind and solar generation in the UK, Europe and Australia.

Electric vehicle charging 
The Electric Universe service, which aims to simplify public charging of electric vehicles, was launched in 2020 as Electric Juice and rebranded in 2022. As of September 2022, more than 450 charging companies were taking part, allowing customers access to over 300,000 chargers in over 50 countries through a single card and/or app. All drivers can use the service, and Octopus Energy customers have the option of paying their charging costs through their domestic energy bills.

Software development 
Octopus Energy licenses their proprietary customer management system called Kraken, which runs on Amazon's cloud computing service. It was first licensed by UK rival Good Energy in late 2019, for an initial three-year term, to manage its 300,000 customers. 

In March 2020 it was announced that E.ON and its Npower subsidiary had licensed the technology to manage their combined 10 million customers. In May 2021 it was announced that E.ON had completed the migration of all two million former npower customers to its Kraken-powered E.ON Next customer service platform. The migration was hailed as being responsible for E.ON's financial recovery in the UK. The Kraken software was also licensed to Australia's Origin Energy as part of their May 2020 agreement.

In November 2021, EDF Energy agreed a deal with Octopus Energy Group to move its five million customers onto its Kraken platform. The customer accounts will be migrated onto Kraken from 2023, increasing the number of energy accounts contracted to be served via Kraken to over 20million worldwide. Kraken also has strategic partnerships with Hanwha Group and Tokyo Gas.

Marketing

Climate change 
 
In 2019 Octopus launched a 'Portraits from the Precipice' campaign, which sought to raise awareness of climate change and encouraged customers to switch to greener energy deals. The campaign artwork was exhibited at over 5,000 sites, making it the largest ever digital out-of-home (DOOH) art exhibition. As a result of the campaign, Octopus registered a 163% increase in sign-ups and gained 37,000 customers. The campaign won the 2020 Marketing Week Masters award for utilities, and the 2020 Energy Institute award for Public Engagement.

Solar Energy at COP26 
 
In November 2021 Octopus financed 'Grace of the Sun', a large-scale art piece by Robert Montgomery made using the Little Sun solar lamps designed by Olafur Eliasson and Frederik Ottesen. The project, which coincided with COP26, was realised in Glasgow through collaboration with the local art community, and was designed as a call for global leaders to invest in renewable energies such as solar PV, in order to power a sustainable future.

References

External links 
 
 
 

British companies established in 2015
Companies based in London
Electric power companies of the United Kingdom
Renewable resource companies established in 2015
Renewable energy companies of the United Kingdom
Utilities of the United Kingdom
Renewable energy companies of France
Electric power companies